Theodore "Jim" Blackburn (born 2 July 1943) is an American politician serving as a Republican member of the Wyoming House of Representatives representing District 42 since January 5, 2015.

Elections

2010
Blackburn challenged incumbent Republican Representative Pete Illoway in the Republican primary and lost, 58% to 42%.

2014
After incumbent Republican Representative Lynn Hutchings retired to run for the Wyoming Senate, Blackburn announced his candidacy. He defeated Tom Jones in the Republican primary with 55% of the vote. Blackburn defeated Democrat Gary Datus in the general election, 66% to 34%.

2016
Blackburn ran unopposed for the Republican nomination, and defeated Democrat Juliet Daniels in the general election with 68.3% of the vote.

References

External links
Official page at the Wyoming Legislature
Profile from Ballotpedia

Living people
1943 births
Republican Party members of the Wyoming House of Representatives
Politicians from Cheyenne, Wyoming
21st-century American politicians